Nate Allen Sallie (born October 28, 1976) is an American singer-songwriter, recording artist, multi-instrumentalist, and concert performer signed with Curb Records. He was previously a member of NewSong.

Biography 

Recording artist, concert performer and singer/songwriter Nate Sallie has won numerous music awards, penned multiple radio hits, served as lead singer for Grammy nominated band Newsong, toured the globe, earned a bachelor's degree in Music and continues to study and expand his knowledge of music and the music business.

Nate launched his career in college coffee houses as Nate Sallie and the Melt Like Sugar Orchestra. He was offered three record deals before landing with Curb Records and recording his first project Inside Out (2003), which yielded numerous radio hits. His second studio project, Ruined for Ordinary (2007), also yielded several hits.  In addition to having songs on WoW and Absolute Smash Hit Compilations, Nate has contributed songs to numerous best-selling recording artists.

Discography

Studio albums

Singles 
{| class="wikitable" style="text-align:center;"
|-
! scope="col" rowspan="2" style="width:1em;"| Year
! scope="col" rowspan="2" style="width:10em;"| Title
! scope="col" colspan="2"| Peak positions
! scope="col" rowspan="2" style="width:10em;"| Album
|- style="font-size:smaller;"
! width="45"| US Christ.
! width="45"| US Christ AC
|-
| rowspan="5"| 2003
| "It's About Time"
|align="center"| —
|align="center"| —
| rowspan="6"| Inside Out
|-
| "Inside Out"
|align="center"| —
|align="center"| —
|-
| "Without You"
|align="center"| —
|align="center"| —
|-
| "All About You"
|align="center"| —
|align="center"| —
|-
| "Whatever It Takes"
|align="center"| 2
|align="center"| 2
|-
| rowspan="1"| 2005
| "Save Me"
|align="center"| 21
|align="center"| 19
|-
| rowspan="3"| 2007
| "Breakthrough"<ref>[http://1cubed.com/display.php?ID=111&sectionID=29 1cubed Review of Ruined For Ordinary], Emily Kohl, Reviewed March 20, 2007, Retrieved July 1, 2007</ref>
|align="center"| —
|align="center"| —
| rowspan="3"| Ruined for Ordinary|-
| "Holy Spirit"
|align="center"| —
|align="center"| —
|-
| "Lone Ranger"
|align="center"| 16
|align="center"| 19
|-
|}

 Compilation contributions 

 "Whatever It Takes" (from Inside Out) - WOW Hits 2005, Fervent Records
 "All About You" (from Inside Out) - Absolute Smash Hits 2004, Fervent Records

 Books 

 Sing Through Me: Songs and Stories Inspired By A Life Ruined For Ordinary!'' (2007)

References

External links 

 

Musicians from Washington, D.C.
Living people
1977 births